Tiavo Tem is a Malagasy football club who currently plays in  the THB Champions League the top division of Malagasy football.
The team is based in Manakara city in eastern Madagascar.

Stadium
Currently the team plays at the Municipal Stadium.

Honours
Manakara Regional League 2013

References

Soccerway

Football clubs in Madagascar